The following is a list of county roads in Bradford County, Florida.  All county roads are maintained by the county in which they reside.

County roads in Bradford County

References

FDOT GIS data, accessed January 2014

 
County